Beney is a surname. Notable people with the surname include:

Bert Beney (1883–1915), English footballer
Nicolas Beney (b. 1980), Swiss footballer

 Other
 Beney-en-Woëvre, commune in the Grand Est region in northeastern France
 Mount Beney, the largest of the La Grange Nunataks